Deolen Village IN Indian district of Karauli (Rajasthan)

"Deolen" is a village in the toda-bhim tehsil, Karauli district which lies in eastern Rajasthan. It is a Gurjar dominant village with "Rankwal" being the 'gotra' or sub-caste. The village has a rich history probably dating back to medieval India. The village lies on the bank of river Gambhir. A dam built on this river (Panchna dam) near Karauli has affected the village adversely and left it with scarcity of water which is an obstacle for the villagers with agriculture being their main occupation. It is one of the developed and populous village compared its neighbour villages. Hindaun city is the nearest town, about 15 km. Hindaun city is well connected by rail and roads to major Indian cities.

Déolen is a small coastal village in the commune of Locmaria-Plouzané in Brittany, France.

Déolen has a popular surfing beach. It is 12 kilometers from Brest and 21 kilometers from the Brest International Airport. It was the landfall of the French transatlantic telegraph cables.

References

 Description of the French transatlantic telegraph cable
Satyender singh vill deolen india

Populated coastal places in France

Ú